Anass Najah (born 16 September 1997) is a Dutch professional footballer of Moroccan descent who plays as a midfielder for Telstar.

Club career
He made his professional debut in the Eerste Divisie for RKC Waalwijk on 4 November 2016 in a game against FC Den Bosch.

For the 2022–23 season, Najah returned to Telstar after a season in Cyprus.

Personal life
Born in the Netherlands, Najah is of Moroccan descent. He is the younger brother of Imad Najah.

References

External links
 

1997 births
Footballers from Utrecht (city)
Living people
Dutch footballers
Dutch sportspeople of Moroccan descent
Association football midfielders
Eerste Divisie players
RKC Waalwijk players
SC Telstar players
Akritas Chlorakas players
Dutch expatriate footballers
Expatriate footballers in Cyprus
Dutch expatriate sportspeople in Cyprus